Wessen is a surname. Notable people with the surname include:

Elias Wessén (1889–1981), Swedish linguist
Randii Wessen (born 1958), American astronomer

See also
Jessen (surname)